Carlos Sanz (1903-1981) was a Spanish publisher and historian of cartography based in Madrid. He died at the end of 1981.<ref>Tony Campbell, Chronicle for 1981–, Imago Mundi, Vol. 34 (1982), pp.90-98.</ref> He donated books and maps to the University of Miami.

Works
 (ed.) La Carta de Colón anunciando el descubrimiento del Nuevo Mundo, 15 febrero-14 marzo, 1493 by Christopher Columbus, 1956
 Primitivas relaciones de España con Asia y Oceanía: los dos primeros libros impresos en Filipinas, mas un tercero en discordia, 1957
 (ed.) Primera historia de China, Sevilla, 1577 by Bernardino de Escalente, 1958
 Bibliografía general de la Carta de Colón, 1958
 (ed.) Bibliotheca Americana vetustissima; a description of works relating to America published between the years 1492 and 1551 by Henry Harrisse. Madrid, 1958
 La Geographia de Ptolomeo, ampliada con los primeros mapas impresos de América, desde 1507; estudio bibliográfico y crítico, con el catálogo de las ediciones aparecidas desde 1475 a 1883, comentado e ilustrado, 1959
 El nombre América; libros y mapas que lo impusieron, 1959
 El gran secreto de la Carta de Colón (crítica histórica) y otras adiciones a la Bibliotheca Americana vetustissima, 1959
 Bibliotheca Americana vetustissima: comentario crítico e índice general cronológico de los seis volúmenes que componen la obra, 1960
 Mapas antiguos del mundo: siglos XV-XVI. 2 vols. Madrid, 1962.
 (ed.) Diario de Colón; libro de la primera navegación y descubrimiento de las Indias by Christopher Columbus, 1962
 Cartografia histórica de los descubrimientos australes, 1967
 Australia. Su descubrimiento y denominación. Con la reproducción facsímil de Memorial número 8 de Quirós en español original, y en las diversas traducciones contemporáneas, 1973
 Hacia el descubrimiento del verdadero ser de la historia?: conferencia pronunciada en la Fundación Universitaria Española el día 21 de marzo de 1974'', 1974

References

1903 births
1981 deaths
Historians of cartography
20th-century Spanish historians
Spanish publishers (people)